Lolohea Mahe (born 1982) is a Tongan mixed martial artist who last competed in the Super Heavyweight division. A professional competitor since 2007, he formerly competed for Strikeforce and King of the Cage.

Background
Mahe is from Maui, Hawaii and is of Samoan and Tongan descent. Mahe's father was a rugby player but would later become a preacher while Mahe's mother taught Sunday school. To this day, Mahe sings in his church's choir, where his father still preaches, and Mahe's brother is the musical director of this same church. Mahe lived four houses away from future UFC veteran and winner of The Ultimate Fighter 3, Kendall Grove. The two were close friends growing up and often would fight each other as a form of recreation during their high school years, putting on gloves and even making videos of their fights. Before becoming a professional mixed martial arts fighter, Mahe spent five years in prison. In addition to his career in mixed martial arts, Mahe had a job delivering flowers.

Mixed martial arts career

Early career
Mahe began his career against John Rosa, who was then undefeated, at the FFM 3 event in October 2007. Mahe took this fight even though he had no previous formal mixed martial arts training but was victorious, defeating Rosa via submission (strikes) in the first round. He followed this up with a victory over Desi Miner via TKO (punches) at 2:12 of the first round.

Mahe then defeated Vilatonu Fonokalaifi via TKO (injury) in the second round. Mahe's next fight was against future Ultimate Fighter veteran, Scott Junk. After three rounds, it went to the judges decision and the fight was declared a draw, giving Mahe his first non-stoppage and a record of 3–0–1.

Mahe bounced back against Pama Fuga in June 2009, defeating him via TKO (punches) at 1:49 of the first round.

Strikeforce
Mahe then signed for Strikeforce and made his promotional debut in March 2010, against Lavar Johnson, who held a record of 13–3 prior to the fight. The fight also headlined the ShoMMA card, which was titled Strikeforce Challengers: Johnson vs. Mahe.

Late into the second round, Johnson was able to pick up the TKO win (via punches), handing Mahe his first professional loss as well as a 45-day medical suspension.

Mahe fought future UFC veteran Shane Del Rosario on July 23, 2010 at Strikeforce Challengers: del Rosario vs. Mahe losing via TKO in the first round.

Personal life
On January 27, 2010, Mahe was arrested in Lahaina, Hawaii after a fight broke out between him and a group of men in the Lahaina Cannery Mall parking lot at 1:25 am. The trouble started inside Lulu's Lahaina Surf Club & Grill inside the shopping center and Mahe was seen "grabbing and shoving" several other large men. When police officers arrived and tried to break it up, he lunged at them and was Tased. He and another man were charged with disorderly conduct and released after posting $100 bail.

Mahe and his family are Methodists.

Mixed martial arts record

|-
| Win
| align=center| 11-4-1
| Raymond Lopez
| Decision (unanimous)
| X-1: World Events 47
| 
| align=center| 3
| align=center| 5:00
| Honolulu, Hawaii, United States
|
|-
| Win
| align=center| 10–4–1
| Jimmy Ambriz
| TKO (submission to punches)
| X-1: Armed and Dangerous
| 
| align=center| 1
| align=center| 0:37
| Wailuku, Hawaii, United States
|
|-
|Win
| align=center| 9–4–1
| Trent Starding
| KO
| X-1: The Return
| 
| align=center| 1
| align=center| 0:30
| Wailuku, Hawaii, United States
|Super Heavyweight debut.
|-
|Loss
| align=center| 8–4–1
| Andenilson Clementino
| TKO (punches)
| KOTC: Unsigned
| 
| align=center| 1
| align=center| 0:42
| Maui, Hawaii, United States
| 
|-
| Win
| align=center| 8–3–1
| Rob Jackson
| TKO (punches)
| KOTC: Devastation
| 
| align=center| 1
| align=center| 1:37
| Highland, California, United States
| 
|-
| Loss
| align=center| 7–3–1
| Cody East
| TKO (punches)
| KOTC: Regulators
| 
| align=center| 1
| align=center| 3:01
| Scottsdale, Arizona, United States
| 
|-
| Win
| align=center| 7–2–1
| Edwin Dewees
| TKO (punches)
| Maui Fighting Championships
| 
| align=center| 1
| align=center| 1:37
| Maui, Hawaii, United States
|Won MFC Heavyweight Championship.
|-
| Win
| align=center| 6–2–1
| Desi Miner
| TKO (punches)
| KOTC: Mana
| 
| align=center| 2
| align=center| 4:27
| Honolulu, Hawaii, United States
| 
|-
| Win
| align=center| 5–2–1
| Henry Bell
| TKO (punches)
| X-1: Champions 3
| 
| align=center| 1
| align=center| 1:49
| Honolulu, Hawaii, United States
| 
|-
| Loss
| align=center| 4–2–1
| Shane del Rosario
| TKO (knees and punches)
| Strikeforce Challengers: del Rosario vs. Mahe
| 
| align=center| 1
| align=center| 3:48
| Everett, Washington, United States
| 
|-
| Loss
| align=center| 4–1–1
| Lavar Johnson
| TKO (punches)
| Strikeforce Challengers: Johnson vs. Mahe
| 
| align=center| 2
| align=center| 3:29
| Fresno, California, United States
|Mahe missed weight by 2 lbs.
|-
| Win
| align=center| 4–0–1
| Pama Fuga
| TKO (punches)
| UNU 2 Operation: Fire at Will
| 
| align=center| 1
| align=center| 1:49
| United States
| 
|-
| Draw
| align=center| 3–0–1
| Scott Junk
| Draw
| X-1: New Beginning
| 
| align=center| 3
| align=center| 5:00
| Hawaii, United States
| 
|-
| Win
| align=center| 3–0
| Vilatonu Fonokalaifi
| TKO (injury)
| Niko Vitale Promotions
| 
| align=center| 2
| align=center| N/A
| United States
| 
|-
| Win
| align=center| 2–0
| Desi Miner
| TKO (punches)
| X-1 Events: Champions
| 
| align=center| 1
| align=center| 2:12
| United States
| 
|-
| Win
| align=center| 1–0
| John Rosa
| TKO (punches)
| FFM 3
| 
| align=center| 1
| align=center| N/A
| United States
|

References

External links

1982 births
Living people
American male mixed martial artists
Heavyweight mixed martial artists
Super heavyweight mixed martial artists
Mixed martial artists utilizing Muay Thai
Mixed martial artists from Hawaii
American Muay Thai practitioners
American Methodists